The 2009 Eliteserien promotion/relegation play-offs was the 37th time a spot in the Norwegian top flight was decided by play-off matches between top tier and second level clubs.

At the end of the 2009 season, Bodø/Glimt and Lyn were relegated directly to the 2010 1. divisjon, and was replaced by Haugesund and Hønefoss who were directly promoted.

Background
The play-offs between Eliteserien and 1. divisjon have been held every year since 1972 with exceptions in 1994 and 2011. In 2009, the play-offs took place for the two divisions following the conclusion of the regular season and were contested by the fourteenth-placed club in Eliteserien and the three clubs finishing below the automatic promotion places in 1. divisjon. The fixtures were determined by final league position – two semifinals: 14th in Eliteserien v 5th in 1. divisjon and 4th in 1. divisjon v 5th in 1. divisjon, and the winners then played each other to determine who played in Eliteserien the following season.

Qualified teams
Four teams entered a play-off for the last Eliteserien spot for the 2009 season. These were:
 Fredrikstad (14th placed team in the Tippeligaen)
 Kongsvinger (third placed team in the 1. divisjon)
 Sogndal (fourth placed team in the 1. divisjon)
 Sarpsborg 08 (fifth placed team in the 1. divisjon)

The four teams first played single game knockout semifinals, and the winners (Kongsvinger and Sarpsborg 08) advanced to a two-legged final for the 16th and last spot in the 2010 Tippeligaen season. Kongsvinger were promoted to the top flight with a 5–4 win on aggregate against Sarpsborg 08.

Matches

First round

Fredrikstad were relegated to the 1. divisjon.

Final
The two winning sides from the first round, Sarpsborg 08 and Kongsvinger, took part in a two-legged play-off to decide who would play in the 2010 Tippeligaen.

First leg

Second leg

Kongsvinger won 5–4 on aggregate and were promoted to the 2010 Tippeligaen.

Bracket

References

Eliteserien play-offs
2009 in Norwegian football